About Sara is a 2005 Swedish drama film directed by Othman Karim. It won the Golden George at the 28th Moscow International Film Festival. The film is Karim's feature debut.

Cast
 Linda Zilliacus as Sara
 Alexander Skarsgård as Kalle Öberg
 Hugo Emretsson as Stefan
 Alexander Karim as Pelle
 Siw Erixon as Saras mamma
 Eva Rydberg as Kalles mamma

References

External links
 
 

2005 films
2005 drama films
Swedish drama films
2000s Swedish-language films
2000s Swedish films